Lermontovo is a rural locality (a selo) and the administrative center of Lermontovsky Selsoviet of Seryshevsky District, Amur Oblast, Russia. The population was 254 as of 2018. There are 9 streets.

Geography 
Lermontovo is located 45 km northeast of Seryshevo (the district's administrative centre) by road. Pavlovka is the nearest rural locality.

References 

Rural localities in Seryshevsky District